Spinocentruropsis papuanus is a species of beetle in the family Cerambycidae, and the only species in the genus Spinocentruropsis. It was described by Gérard J. Minet in 1987.

References

Morimopsini
Beetles described in 1987